The tort of seduction was a civil wrong or tort in common law legal systems, and still exists in some jurisdictions.

Originally, it allowed an unmarried woman's father - or other person employing her services - to sue for the loss of these services, when she became pregnant and could no longer perform them.  Over time, the tort was altered, so that instead, it would be used by an unmarried woman to sue on the grounds of seduction to obtain damages from her seducer, if her consent to sex was based upon his misrepresentation.

Breach of promise was a similar, but not identical, tort that was used frequently in similar situations in the past, but has now been abolished in most jurisdictions.

Legal basis
Initially, the tort of seduction was a remedy for a father's property interest in his daughter's chastity. However, the damages to which the father would be entitled were based on the father's loss of the working services of a daughter, much as a master could sue if a third-party caused injury to his servant that rendered the servant unable to work, because she was "seduced and debauched" and became pregnant as a result of nonmarital sexual activity. The tort of seduction was one of the most common civil actions toward the end of the 19th century, and fathers were often successful before juries.

In the 20th century, the action was criticised as maintaining "property interests in humans", and the tort was recast to recognize personal injury to the woman, rather than solely deprivation of a father's property right. Most jurisdictions granted the victim (the wronged woman) the right to sue in her own name. (Fathers could still sue as well, on the ground that they had a moral interest in their daughters' chastity). The suing woman was "usually but not always a virgin".

England
Historically, the seduced female could not bring a suit herself. Rather, it would usually be brought by her father, acting under the legal fiction that the parent-child relationship falls under the master-servant relationship. However, if the daughter was a contracted servant, a suit could not be brought by her father against her master. English courts did not require the father to bring the suit: any person who had suffered a loss of the woman's services could bring a claim, and successful claimants included widowed mothers and aunts.
Generally, seductions had to result in pregnancy in order to be actionable, although exceptions did exist. Although damages were nominally awarded for the financial loss to the claimant, by the 19th century they tended to reflect more the social embarrassment and stigma associated with pregnancy out of wedlock that was suffered by the claimant.

The tort was abolished in England & Wales in 1971, under section 5 of the Law Reform (Miscellaneous Provisions) Act 1970.

Canada
Property and civil rights is a provincial power in Canada, so all torts can vary by province. Many Canadian judges highly disliked the tort, and sought to interpret it as narrowly as possible, citing concerns that the tort could be used for extortion, vindictiveness and the encouragement of immorality. Most provinces abolished it due to incompatibility with the Canadian Charter of Rights and Freedoms, although successful actions by the latter half of the 20th century were increasingly rare anyway.

Alberta
As described below, the Northwest Territories enacted seduction laws in 1903, when Alberta was still part of the Territories. When it became a separate province in 1905, it retained this law.
The 1934 John Brownlee sex scandal revolved around a seduction suit.
The law was repealed in 1985 by the Charter Omnibus Act, S.A. 1985, c. 15, since the law was considered contrary to section 15 of the Canadian Charter of Rights and Freedoms which precludes discrimination.

British Columbia
The action was abolished by the Family Law Reform Amendments Act 1985, c72.

Manitoba
In 1892, Manitoba adopted anti-seduction laws, copying and citing in part the Ontario legislation. It abolished these laws in 1982, under the Equality of Status Act, alongside all other heartbalm actions.

New Brunswick
New Brunswick repealed seduction laws in 1985, since they were incompatible with section 15 of the Canadian Charter of Rights and Freedoms, which precludes discrimination.

North West Territories
In 1903, the Northwest Territories adopted anti-seduction laws. At this time, Alberta and Saskatchewan were both part of the North West Territories, and retained this law even after becoming separate provinces in 1905. Similar to Prince Edward Island's 1852 statute, this notably allowed for a seduced woman to sue for herself with this tort, for personal hurt and injury (as opposed to much of the previous law, targeted at compensating a father).
The law was abolished in 1985, due to incompatibility with section 15 of the Canadian Charter of Rights and Freedoms, which precludes discrimination.

Ontario
An Act to make the remedy for cases of seduction more effectual, and to tender the fathers of illegitimate children liable for their support, was passed in Upper Canada on March 4, 1837. Amending traditional common law, it allowed fathers to sue their daughters' masters for the tort of seduction. It also held biological fathers liable for children conceived out of wedlock.

The Seduction Act was repealed in 1978 by the Family Law Reform Act.

Saskatchewan
As described above, the Northwest Territories enacted seduction laws in 1903, when Saskatchewan was still part of the Territories. When it became a separate province in 1905, it retained this law.
The province repealed its seduction law in 1990: becoming the last province to do so.

Prince Edward Island
An 1852 statute in Prince Edward Island notably allowed for a seduced woman to sue for herself with this tort, for personal hurt and injury (as opposed to much of the previous law, targeted at compensating a father), although damages were capped at 100 pounds. However, two years later, in McInnis v McCallum, the court held that a woman could only sue for damages herself if she could show that at the time of the seduction, she also had had a parent, master or guardian entitled to sue under the common law action, for loss of her services.

United States
In the United States, the tort of seduction has been abolished in "most states". Fears of fraudulent suits, combined with a turn away from the view of property interests in persons, led to the enactment of "heart balm" statutes, abolishing causes of action for seduction, breach of promise, alienation of affection, criminal conversation, etc. in most states in the 20th century.

Notes

See also
Alienation of affections
 Kranzgeld in Germany

Tort law
Civil law (common law)
Subject
Sex and the law
Legal history
Seduction